Jan C. Perry (born June 8, 1955) is an American politician from California. A member of the Democratic Party, she served on the Los Angeles City Council.

Career

Perry was a member of the ninth district of the Los Angeles City Council from 2001 to 2013 and was President Pro Tempore of the Los Angeles City Council. She is a member of the Democratic Party. She was a candidate for Mayor of Los Angeles in 2013.

Perry was elected to office in 2001 to succeed Councilwoman Rita Walters, for whom she had served as Chief of Staff. Perry was re-elected in 2005 and 2009, and left office in 2013.

Perry helped enact restrictions on fast food restaurants in her district. As part of a larger campaign to combat high obesity rates, she has also funded public parks to promote outdoor activity and supported incentives to encourage more grocery stores to open within her district.

Jan Perry was the General Manager of the Los Angeles Economic & Workforce Development Department (EWDD) of the City of Los Angeles. Initially appointed as Interim General Manager of the Los Angeles Economic & Workforce Development Department (EWDD) in July 2013 by Los Angeles Mayor Eric Garcetti, her former rival. She was named General Manager in November 2013. She stepped down at the end of 2018.

In 2022, Jan Perry ran for Congress in California's 37th congressional district to succeed Karen Bass, who ran for Mayor of Los Angeles.  She was defeated by Sydney Kamlager.

Jan Perry Wetlands
A 9-acre underutilized bus maintenance yard was developed into a South Los Angeles storm water wetlands and community park.

The Los Angeles City Council voted to rename the park "The Jan Perry Wetlands" for her work with the project.

The project includes storm water pre-treatment, storm water treatment wetlands of approximately 4 acres, open park space, and a parking lot sloped to drain into the wetlands.  The project also provides for wildlife viewing, and educational opportunities.  The project was completed in December, 2011.

The project is funded by Los Angeles Proposition "O", 2004 Bond Measure, State and local grant money and funds from the EPA and the Metropolitan Transportation Authority were also used.

Personal life
Perry is a convert to Judaism. She converted in the 1980s.

References

External links

 Jan Perry for Congress campaign website 
 Los Angeles City Council - 9th District (archived)

|-

1955 births
20th-century African-American people
20th-century African-American women
21st-century African-American politicians
21st-century African-American women
21st-century American Jews
21st-century American politicians
21st-century American women politicians
African-American city council members in California
African-American Jews
African-American women in politics
California Democrats
Candidates in the 2022 United States House of Representatives elections
Converts to Judaism
Jewish American people in California politics
Living people
Los Angeles City Council members
University of Southern California alumni
Women city councillors in California